Carolin Weiß (born 13 April 1993) is a German judoka. She is the 2017 European bronze medalist in the +78 kg division.

References

External links
 
 

1993 births
German female judoka
Living people
21st-century German women